John Carleton may refer to:
John Carleton (rugby union) (born 1955), English rugby player
Sir John Carleton, 1st Baronet (died 1637), MP
John Carleton (skier) (1899–1977), American lawyer and skier
John Aiken Carleton (1848–1934), member of the Salvation Army
John of Carleton, Dean of Wells, 1351–1360

See also

Carleton (disambiguation)